Peter Fauster is a former Austrian slalom canoeist who competed in the 1970s. He won three medals at the ICF Canoe Slalom World Championships with a gold (K-1: 1979) and two silvers (K-1 team: 1977, 1979).

References

Austrian male canoeists
Living people
Year of birth missing (living people)
Medalists at the ICF Canoe Slalom World Championships